The women's combination event at the 2010 Asian Games in Guangzhou, China, took place at the Foshan Aquatics Centre on 21 November.

Schedule
All times are China Standard Time (UTC+08:00)

Results 
Legend
R — Reserve

References

Artistic swimming at the 2010 Asian Games